Cygnus X may refer to:
 Cygnus-X (star complex), a giant star formation region 
 Cygnus X (music group)

See also
 Cygnus X-1 (disambiguation)
 Cygnus X-3